The Ohio State Buckeyes men's basketball team represents The Ohio State University in NCAA Division I college basketball competition. The Buckeyes are a member of the Big Ten Conference.

The Buckeyes play their home games at Value City Arena in the Jerome Schottenstein Center in Columbus, Ohio, which opened in 1998. The official capacity of the center is 19,200. Ohio State ranked 28th in the nation in average home attendance as of the 2016 season.

The Buckeyes have won one national championship (1960), been the national runner-up four times, appeared in 10 Final Fours (one additional appearance has been vacated by the NCAA), and appeared in 27 NCAA Tournaments (four other appearances have been vacated).

Thad Matta was named the head coach of Ohio State in 2004 to replace coach Jim O'Brien, who was fired due to NCAA violations which cost Ohio State over 113 wins between 1998 and 2002. On June 5, 2017, after consecutive years of missing the NCAA Tournament, the school announced Matta would not return as head coach after 13 years and 337 wins at Ohio State. On June 9, 2017, the school hired Butler head coach Chris Holtmann as head coach.

Team history

Early years and Olsen era (1898–1958)

The first basketball team at Ohio State University was formed in 1898, playing its first game against East High.  Sparing success followed the Buckeyes throughout their time as an independent school.  In 1912, some 13 years after forming their first basketball team, the Buckeyes joined the Big Nine Conference, which would eventually be known as the Big Ten. At first, the Buckeyes were not able to mount a sustained run, never finishing higher than second in the conference standings.  In 1923, Harold Olsen became head coach, launching the longest basketball coaching dynasty for OSU (24 seasons). Olsen began to see success with the Buckeyes' first conference championship during the 1922–1923 season.  The Olsen era is also highlighted by appearing in the final game for the first NCAA Championship tournament in 1939, where the Buckeyes lost to Oregon 33–46.  The Buckeyes would make three more Final Four appearances under Olsen, along with winning five Big Ten championships.  Following Olsen as head coach, Tippy Dye and Floyd Stahl led the Buckeyes.  Not seeing the same amount of success as Olsen did, Dye and Stahl had one NCAA Tournament appearance between them.  With the closing of the 1950s, the Ohio State basketball team was not considered a national powerhouse. But it continued to develop and led to the hiring of a man who would change basketball at Ohio State and bring it national fame.

Success and Fred Taylor era (1958–1997)

Of all Buckeye coaches, it was Fred Taylor who would put Ohio State basketball on the map.  With the hiring of Taylor in 1958, not much was expected following an 11–11 record during the 1958–1959 season.  However, in 1960, the second-year coach, Taylor, and future Naismith Memorial Basketball Hall of Fame players Jerry Lucas and John Havlicek led the Buckeyes to their first NCAA Championship Title, defeating California 75–55 in the final game.  The 1960 season is the only NCAA Tournament championship that the Buckeyes have claimed. Taylor's team continued its dominance by being the runner-up the following two seasons, and making a total of five tournament appearances during Taylor's 18 seasons tenure.  With the departure of his championship team, Taylor began to see teams accustomed to Ohio State basketball of the past.  Taylor's last season at Ohio State in 1976 had the Buckeyes going 6–20, their worst record, only to be eclipsed by the team in 1995.  Taylor achieved seven conference titles and an impressive overall winning percentage of over 65%.  Past the Taylor era, Ohio State saw Eldon Miller, Gary Williams, and Randy Ayers take the reins as head coach.  Between 1976 and 1997, the Buckeyes made the NCAA bracket only eight times, while being crowned conference champions only twice.

Jim O'Brien (1997–2004)
In 1997, Jim O'Brien was hired to replace head coach Randy Ayers. During his seven years as head coach, O'Brien drove the team to four 20+ win seasons, two Big Ten regular season co-championships, the 2002 Big Ten tournament championship, and a school record four-consecutive NCAA tournament appearances. Controversy erupted when Ohio State athletic director Andy Geiger fired O'Brien over alleged NCAA rules violations. A two-year NCAA investigation found that player Boban Savovic might have received improper benefits while he played for Ohio State. On March 10, 2006, the NCAA gave Ohio State three years' probation and ordered it to pay back all tournament money earned from 1999–2002 when Boban Savovic was on the Buckeyes' roster. In addition, Ohio State was forced to remove all references to team accomplishments by the NCAA directorate from those years including a 1999 visit to the Final Four.

Thad Matta era (2004–2017)

Thad Matta, former head coach at Butler and Xavier, was hired by Ohio State in July 2004.

During Matta's first season at Ohio State, the Buckeyes compiled a 20–12 record, highlighted by a win in the final game of the season over top-ranked Illinois, which was undefeated up until that game. Ohio State was defeated by Wisconsin in the Big Ten tournament quarterfinals, and the team was ineligible for further postseason due to self-imposed sanctions related to Jim O'Brien's time at the school. The 2005–06 season opened with the Buckeyes 11–0 heading into Big Ten play. Ohio State ended the season with a 26–6 record and 12–4 record in conference, the Buckeyes' first outright Big Ten championship since the 1991–92 season. Ohio State lost to Iowa in the Big Ten tournament championship game, but received a No. 2 seed in the NCAA tournament. After a first round win, the Buckeyes lost to No. 7 seed Georgetown 70–52 in the second round.

Matta's 2006–07 Ohio State team entered the season with the second-rated recruiting class in the nation, headed by Greg Oden and Mike Conley, Jr., and ranked No. 4 in the preseason polls. Ohio State entered conference play with an 11–2 record, with the only defeats coming at No. 6 North Carolina and at No. 4 Florida. Ohio State's loss against No. 4 Wisconsin on January 9, 2007 was the last loss of the regular season as the Buckeyes won 14 straight games to end the season with a 27–3 record. Ohio State defeated No. 20 Tennessee and No. 2 Wisconsin during this winning streak and ended the season as the top-ranked team in the nation. Ohio State won the Big Ten tournament, defeating Wisconsin 66–49 in the championship game, and entered the NCAA tournament as the overall No. 1 seed. Ohio State advanced to the Sweet Sixteen for the first time under Matta after an overtime victory against Xavier, which Matta had previously coached. A one-point victory over Tennessee and a 92–76 victory over No. 2 Memphis advanced the Buckeyes to the Final Four. Ohio State defeated Georgetown 67–60 in the semifinal game, but lost to Florida 84–75 in the National Championship game. Oden and Conley both would enter the NBA draft following the season, with Oden being drafted number one overall and Conley going fourth.

The 2007–08 season was a rebuilding one. Ohio State ended the season with a 19–12 record, finishing fifth in the Big Ten. It lost to Michigan State in the Big Ten tournament quarterfinals and missed out on the NCAA tournament. The Buckeyes did receive a No. 1 seed in the National Invitation Tournament, where Ohio State would defeat Massachusetts 92–85 in the championship to take the NIT title.

Ohio State began the 2008–09 season with a 9–0 record and would finish 20–9. Ohio State defeated Wisconsin and No. 7 Michigan State to advance to the Big Ten tournament championship, where the Buckeyes lost to No. 24 Purdue. They received a bid to the NCAA tournament as a No. 8 seed, where they lost to No. 9 Siena in the first round.

The 2009–10 season marked Matta's sixth at Ohio State, with the team entering the season ranked No. 17 in the nation.  The Buckeyes had compiled a 7–1 record before Evan Turner, who was averaging 20.6 points and 12.9 rebounds per game, was injured. Turner returned later in the season and help finish the season with a 24–7 record and a share of the Big Ten regular season championship. A victory over Minnesota in the Big Ten tournament gave Matta his second Big Ten tournament title and the Buckeyes a No. 2 seed in the NCAA tournament. Ohio State advanced to the Sweet Sixteen before losing to No. 6-seeded Tennessee 76–73. Turner was named the National Player of the Year and entered the NBA draft, where he was selected second overall.

Matta's recruiting class heading into the 2010–11 season was highly regard and the Buckeyes returned some key seniors such as David Lighty and Jon Diebler. Ohio State was ranked No. 4 in the preseason polls and entered Big Ten conference play undefeated at 13–0, defeating No. 9 Florida and moving up to No. 2 in the nation. Ohio State continued to dominate the opposition during the regular season, pushing its record to 24–0 and 11–0 in conference play before losing the first game at No. 13 Wisconsin. Another loss at No. 11 Purdue marked their last loss in the regular season. Ohio State ended the season with a 29–2 record and 16–2 record in the Big Ten, winning the outright Big Ten regular season championship. OSU defeated Penn State for the Big Ten tournament championship, giving the Buckeyes their second tournament championship in a row and Matta's third tournament championship as head coach. Ohio State entered the NCAA tournament as the No. 1 overall seed for the second time under Matta. However, for the second year in a row, the Buckeyes failed to advance past the Sweet Sixteen, losing to Kentucky 62–60.

The Buckeyes, led by returning starters Jared Sullinger, Deshaun Thomas and Aaron Craft, entered the 2011–12 season ranked No. 3 in the nation. Ohio State entered Big Ten play with a 12–1 record, losing at No. 13 Kansas without Sullinger, who was injured. Ohio State finished the season winning a share of the Big Ten regular season championship and lost to Michigan State in the Big Ten tournament championship. Ohio State received a No. 2 seed in the NCAA tournament and advanced to the Final Four for the second time under Matta after a 77–70 victory over No. 1-seeded Syracuse. The Buckeye season would end with another loss to Kansas, 64–62. Following the season, Sullinger entered the NBA draft and was taken 21st overall.

The 2012–13 Buckeyes entered the season ranked No. 4 in the country. Led by Deshaun Thomas and Aaron Craft, they entered Big Ten play with only two losses, at No. 2 Duke and at home against No. 9 Kansas. They finished the season 13–5 in Big Ten play to finish in a tie for second place, but would beat No. 8 Michigan State and No. 22 Wisconsin to win the Big Ten tournament. As a No. 2 seed in the NCAA tournament, they advanced to the Elite Eight before losing to Wichita State. Following the season, Thomas declared for the NBA draft.

With the early departure of Thomas, the Buckeyes struggled in 2013–14, finishing the season 25–10, 10–8 in fifth place in Big Ten play. They advanced to the semifinals of the Big Ten tournament before losing to Michigan. As a No. 6 seed in the NCAA tournament, they lost to Dayton in the second round (formerly known as the first round).

The 2015 Buckeyes were led by freshman D'Angelo Russell, but still finished in sixth place in Big Ten play with an 11–7 record. Despite losing to Michigan State in the quarterfinals of the Big Ten tournament, OSU received a No. 10 seed in the NCAA tournament. They upset No. 7-seeded VCU in the second round, before losing to No. 5 Arizona in the third round. Following the season, Russell declared for the NBA draft and was selected second overall.

Without Russell, the 2016 Buckeyes finished 21–14, 11–7 in Big Ten play to finish in seventh place. They lost in the quarterfinals of the Big Ten tournament to Michigan State and failed to receive an invite to the NCAA tournament. They did receive a bid to the NIT, where they lost in the second round to Florida.

In 2016–17, OSU finished the season 17–15, 7–11 in Big Ten play to finish in a tie for 10th place. As the No. 11 seed in the Big Ten tournament, the Buckeyes lost in the first round to Rutgers. They did not receive an invite to a postseason tournament.

In a surprise move more than two months after the season ended, the school announced that, after failing to make the NCAA Tournament in 2016 and 2017, Matta would not return as head coach for the 2017–18 season. Ohio State won 20 or more games in 12 of Matta's 13 seasons, received a berth in the NCAA Tournament eight times, made it to the Sweet Sixteen four times, and to the Final Four twice. Ohio State won the Big Ten regular-season championship five times and Big Ten tournament championship three times, appearing in the championship game six times under Matta.

Thad Matta's record at Ohio State

Chris Holtmann era (2017–present) 

On June 9, 2017, the school hired Butler head coach Chris Holtmann as head coach. The Buckeyes exceeded any and all expectations in Holtmann’s first season in Columbus. Picked to finish no better than 11th in preseason media polls, the Buckeyes stormed out to a 9–0 record in Big Ten. Highlighting the 2017–18 season were home wins over Michigan, overcoming a first-half 20-point deficit, and No. 1 Michigan State along with a road victory at No. 3 Purdue, the Boilermakers’ only home loss of the season. Holtmann was named the 2018 Big Ten Coach of the Year after leading the Buckeyes to a 25–9 overall record, a second-place finish in the Big Ten regular-season standings (15–3). The Buckeyes were led by Big Ten Player of the Year, Keita Bates-Diop, and a four-year starter, Jae’Sean Tate; both of which are now in the NBA. The season ended on a somber note as the Buckeyes were eliminated in the second round of the 2018 NCAA tournament by Gonzaga.

In 2018-19, Holtmann's Buckeyes went 20-15, marking the sixth consecutive season a Holtmann team had won 20 or more games. As an 11-seed the Buckeyes knocked off 6-seed Iowa State to advance to the second round of the 2019 NCAA tournament, before being eliminated by Houston.

The 2019-20 season was cut short with the cancellation of the 2020 Big Ten and NCAA Tournaments. The Buckeyes posted an overall record of 21–10, which included four wins vs. Top 10 opponents (Villanova, at North Carolina, Kentucky and Maryland). Ohio State finished tied for fifth in the Big Ten at 11–9. Despite no postseason tournament, the Buckeyes managed 20 wins, marking the seventh consecutive season Holtmann-coach teams reached that plateau.

In a season shortened by COVID-19 implications, the 2020–21 Buckeyes went 21–10 record overall. Ohio State finished tied for fifth in the B1G (12–8) and reached the championship game of the 2021 Big Ten Tournament. The Buckeyes were led by 1st Team All-Big Ten forward EJ Liddell, and 3rd Team All-Big Ten guard Duane Washington Jr. Ohio State appeared in the AP Top 10 for the final seven weeks of the season and earned a #2 seed in the 2021 NCAA Tournament, only to lose to 15-seed Oral Roberts in the first round.

The 2021–22 Buckeyes posted a 20–12 record and 12–8 conference record. The team lost in the second round of the 2022 NCAA tournament to Villanova.

Holtmann is the second Ohio State coach to win 20 or more games in his first five seasons in Columbus, joining Thad Matta (12 from 2005–2016). However, he has not won a conference championship, and his teams have struggled in postseason play: through his first 11 seasons as a head coach, his teams had never won a conference tournament, and had advanced beyond the first weekend of the NCAA tournament only once, leading to some criticism from fans.

The criticism of Holtmann continued in the 2022-23 season, as after starting the season with 10 wins in 13 games, the Buckeyes went into an extended tailspin, losing 14 of 15 games. On February 12, the Buckeyes scored just 41 points in a home loss to Michigan State, the program's lowest point total in 27 years.

Facilities

The Ohio State Buckeyes presently play their home games in 19,200-seat Jerome Schottenstein Center. The first official home court for the Buckeyes was the Ohio Expo Center Coliseum. Constructed in 1918, the Buckeyes called this arena home between the years 1920 to 1955. The facility had a capacity of 7,000 people.

In 1955, a new facility was built on the campus of Ohio State named the St. John Arena named after Lynn St. John, an Ohio State basketball coach and athletic director.  This building, while hosting the men's basketball team, also hosted (and still to this day hosts) volleyball, gymnastics, and wrestling.  The capacity of St. John Arena is 13,276.  This building is the only Buckeye arena to serve as home for an Ohio State men's basketball championship team in 1960.

With the aging St. John Arena over 40 years old, the Ohio State University decided to build the Schottenstein Center to hold men's and women's basketball as well as hockey.  The 770,000 sq foot arena was completed in 1998 and seats 19,500 for basketball games.

Ohio State completed a $19 million renovation to the Schottenstein Center in 2013 that includes updated locker rooms for the Men's and Women's Basketball teams, a new training room with hydrotherapy pools, a new weight room, and a new practice gym to complement the existing gym.  A $34 million renovation completed in 2018 improved the concourse as well as added new space for the coaches, team shop, ticket office, and building administration.

During the team's formative years the Buckeyes played their home games at the Ohio State University Armory. Built in 1897 at a cost of $115,000, the massive brick medieval style building was demolished in 1958 after damage caused by a fire. From 1897 to 1917 the Buckeyes used the building known as "Drill Hall" or "The Gymnasium" as their home court, only being asked to leave due to the outbreak of World War I. The team's overall record at the Armory was 178-104.  In 1919, without a definite home, the team played some of their games at Indianola Park as well as the Coliseum and the Armory.  Finally, in 1920, the team officially moved to the Ohio State Fairgrounds and played in their home games at the Ohio Expo Center Coliseum.  During their time at the Coliseum, the Buckeyes played in five national title games.

Coaches

The Buckeyes have had 14 coaches in their 110-year history. Thad Matta, who was hired in 2004, and led the Buckeyes to five NCAA Tournament appearances and two Final Four appearances during the 2006–07 and 2011–12 seasons. The only Ohio State coach to win a national championship was Fred Taylor in 1960.

Current coaching staff

Accomplishments

NCAA National Championships

Final Four history

NCAA tournament seeding history
The NCAA began seeding the tournament with the 1979 edition.

 The * represents overall number one seed which began with the 2004 Tournament.

NCAA tournament results

NIT results
The Buckeyes are two time NIT champions (1986, 2008).

Big Ten tournament championships
Ohio State has won 4 Big Ten tournament championships since its inception during the 1997–98 season. Ohio State won their first title in 2002 under Jim O'Brien (later vacated), while winning 4 under head coach Thad Matta. Under Matta, the Buckeyes appeared in the Big Ten tournament championship five consecutive seasons from 2009 to 2013.

Big Ten regular season championships

Record vs. Big Ten opponents
The Ohio State Buckeyes lead the all-time series vs. seven Big Ten opponents. Two of the all-time series are within three games. These records DO NOT include vacated games (e.g. Purdue does count all their games played against Ohio State and lead the series 94-92 according to their records. Iowa counts all games played against OSU and lead the series 83-83 according to their records).

Awards

Consensus All-American selections
Wes Fesler (1931)
Jimmy Hull (1939)
Dick Schnittker (1950)
Robin Freeman (1955)
Jerry Lucas (1960, 1961*, 1962*)
Gary Bradds (1964*)
Jim Jackson (1991, 1992)
Evan Turner (2010*)
Jared Sullinger (2011, 2012)
D'Angelo Russell (2015)
Dennis Hopson (1987)
*National Player of the Year

Big Ten Player of the Year
Dennis Hopson (1987)
Jim Jackson (1991, 1992)
Scoonie Penn (1999)
Terence Dials (2006)
Evan Turner (2010)
Keita Bates-Diop (2018)

Big Ten Coach of the Year
Eldon Miller (1983)
Randy Ayers (1991, 1992)
Jim O’Brien (1999, 2001)
Thad Matta (2006, 2010)
Chris Holtmann (2018)

First-Team All-Big Ten

All award data taken from

All-time statistical leaders

Career leaders

Single-season leaders

Single-game leaders

All statistical data taken from.

Notable players

 Jon Diebler (born 1988), in the Israel Basketball Premier League
Othello Hunter (born 1986), in the Israeli Basketball Premier League
Lenzelle Smith Jr. (born 1991), in the Israel Basketball Premier League

Retired numbers

Ohio State has retired five jersey numbers.

Honored coaches
Two longtime head coaches have been honored with banners which hang alongside the retired numbers:

References

External links

 

 
Basketball teams established in 1898
1898 establishments in Ohio